William Geoffrey Lowndes Frith Lowndes (born William Geoffrey Lowndes Frith; 24 January 1898 – 23 May 1982), known as Geoffrey Lowndes, was an English first-class cricketer who played for Oxford University, Hampshire and the Marylebone Cricket Club. Lowndes was a right-handed batsman and bowled right-arm medium-fast.

Lowndes was a son of William Frith, also a cricketer, who changed his surname and that of his issue from Frith to Frith Lowndes (to "use the surname of Lowndes in addition to and after that of Frith") in July 1906. He was educated at New College, Oxford, and made his First-class cricket debut in 1921 for Oxford University against the Free Foresters. In 1924 he joined Hampshire, and played for them to 1935, captaining the side in 1934 and 1935. Lowndes also made five appearances for the Marylebone Cricket Club between 1928 and 1934. His final first-class appearance was a mirror to his debut match; Oxford University played the Free Foresters, but this time he played against the university.

Lowndes died in 1982 in Newbury at the age of 84.

References

External links
Geoffrey Lowndes at Cricinfo
Geoffrey Lowndes at CricketArchive

1898 births
1982 deaths
English cricketers
Hampshire cricketers
Hampshire cricket captains
Marylebone Cricket Club cricketers
People from Wandsworth
People from Newbury, Berkshire
Oxford University cricketers
Free Foresters cricketers
Gentlemen cricketers
Harlequins cricketers
Gentlemen of England cricketers
Alumni of New College, Oxford
H. D. G. Leveson Gower's XI cricketers
People educated at Eton College